Aquashicola Creek (Ahkwa-SHIK-ola), also known as Aquanchicola Creek, or Aquanshicola Creek, is a  tributary of the Lehigh River in the Poconos of eastern Pennsylvania in the United States.

The name is derived from the language of the Lenape, meaning "where we fish with the bush net." The creek rises from a swamp to the southeast of Saylorsburg, and flows westward between Chestnut Ridge and Blue Mountain. It meets its major tributary, Buckwha Creek, to the south of Little Gap and joins the Lehigh River at Palmerton.

Tributaries
Buckwha Creek

See also
List of rivers of Pennsylvania
Meniolagomeka, former Indian settlement organized by Moravian missionaries

References

External links
U.S. Geological Survey: PA stream gaging stations

Tributaries of the Lehigh River
Rivers of Pennsylvania
Pocono Mountains
Rivers of Carbon County, Pennsylvania
Rivers of Monroe County, Pennsylvania